The Hills of Utah is a 1951 American Western film directed by John English and starring Gene Autry, Elaine Riley and Donna Martell. The film's sets were designed by the art director Charles Clague.

Plot

Cast
 Gene Autry as Dr. Gene Autry 
 Elaine Riley as Karen McQueen 
 Donna Martell as Nola French 
 Onslow Stevens as Jayda McQueen 
 Denver Pyle as Bowie French 
 William Fawcett as Washoe 
 Harry Lauter as Evan Fox - Henchman 
 Kenne Duncan as Indigo Hubbard - Henchman 
 Pat Buttram as Dusty Cosgrove

References

Bibliography
 Pitts, Michael R. Western Movies: A Guide to 5,105 Feature Films. McFarland, 2012.

External links
 

1951 films
1951 Western (genre) films
American Western (genre) films
Films directed by John English
Columbia Pictures films
American black-and-white films
1950s English-language films
1950s American films